The Mississippi Gambler may refer to:

 The Mississippi Gambler (1929 film), featuring Joseph Schildkraut and Joan Bennett
 Mississippi Gambler (film), a 1942 film directed by John Rawlins
 The Mississippi Gambler (1953 film), starring Tyrone Power and Piper Laurie
 Mississippi Gambler (album), a 1972 album by Herbie Mann